Gorp is a 1980 American comedy film starring Michael Lembeck and Dennis Quaid, and featuring early acting work of Rosanna Arquette and Fran Drescher in supporting roles. Directed by Joseph Ruben, with both story and screenplay by Jeffrey Konvitz and A. Martin Zweiback, the film follows in the tradition of the 1978 fraternity comedy National Lampoon's Animal House, and the 1979 summer camp comedy film Meatballs. Gorp was the penultimate film released by American International Pictures, before How to Beat the High Cost of Living two months later.

Set in a Jewish summer camp, Gorp features the kind of physical, sexual, and scatological comedy prevalent in films of this genre, while playing for comedic effect on the class distinctions between the camp's management, the camp counselors, the waiters, and the kitchen staff.

Plot
A slapstick comedy about the wacky antics of a group of waiters at a Jewish summer camp in upstate New York.

Cast
 Michael Lembeck as Kavell
 Dennis Quaid as Mad Grossman
 Fran Drescher as Evie
 Rosanna Arquette as Judy
 Philip Casnoff as Bergman
 Lisa Shure as Vicki
 David Huddleston as Walrus Wallman
 Robert Trebor as Rabbi Blowitz
 Lou Wagner as Federman
 Julius Harris as Fred the Chef

External links
 
 

1980 films
1980s sex comedy films
American screwball comedy films
1980s English-language films
1980s German-language films
Films directed by Joseph Ruben
Films about Jews and Judaism
American independent films
1980s screwball comedy films
Films about summer camps
American International Pictures films
Films scored by Paul Dunlap
1980 independent films
Teen sex comedy films
1980 comedy films
1980s American films